Vsevolod Vasilyevich Sanayev (Все′волод Васи′льевич Сана′ев; 25 [12, o.s.] February 1912 in Tula, Russian Empire – 27 January 1996 in Moscow, Russia) was a Soviet film and stage actor popular in the 1960s–1970s. Sanayev, a Moscow Art Theatre (and later Mossovet Theatre) actor, was honored in 1969 with the People's Artist of the USSR title; among his other accolades are the Order of Lenin (1971) and the Order of the October Revolution (1981).

Biography
Vsevolod Sanayev was born on 25 February 1912 in Tula. In 1926 — 1930 he worked as a bayan technician at the Tula factory of musical instruments. After a short stint at a local theatre, in 1931 he was invited to join the Tula-based Gorky Theatre of Drama and Comedy and soon enrolled in the Russian Institute of Theatre Arts. After the graduation in 1937 he joined the Moscow Art Theatre troupe. In 1938, he debuted on screen in the film Volga-Volga (where he had two minor roles), and in 1940 enjoyed his first success as Dobryakov in the film The Girl I Love. In 1943, Sanayev joined the Mossovet Theatre and in 1952 moved to the Moscow Art Theatre.

The mass popularity came to Sanayev in the 1950s and 1960s; among his best known roles were Kantaurov in The Return of Vasily Bortnikov (1952), Dontsov in The First Echelon (1955), Kozlov in Five Days, Five Nights (1960), Siply (Husky) in An Optimistic Tragedy (1962); later Colonel Lukin in the war epic Liberation (1968), Professor Stepanov in Pechki-lavochki (1972), and Colonel Zorin (The Return of St. Luca, 1970; The Black Prince, 1973, and The Version of Colonel Zorin, 1978). A staunch communist, Sanayev for many years was the head of the Mosfilm Communist Party committee (partkom).

Vsevolod Sanayev died on 27 January 1996 in Moscow. He is interred in Novodevichy Cemetery.

Family
Vsevolod Sanayev was married to Lidya Sanayeva (1918–1995). Their daughter, the actress Elena Sanayeva, is a widow of the actor and director Rolan Bykov. His grandson Pavel Sanayev is an actor, scriptwriter, theatre director and playwright. His acclaimed 1995 autobiographical play Pokhoronite menya pod plintusom (Bury Me Under a Baseboard) told the harrowing story of his life with a tyrannous grandmother, whom his mother left him with after her marriage.

Filmography

Volga-Volga (1938) - bearded lumberjack / member of the symphony orchestra (dual role)
If War Comes Tomorrow (Yesli zavtra voina, 1938) - paratrooper
A Girl with a Temper (Devushka s kharakterom, 1939) - Surkov, militia officer
The Youth of Commanders (Yunost komandirov, 1939) - Colonel Grishayev
The Girl I Love (Lyubimaya devushka, 1940) - Vasiliy Dobryakov, a working man
Ivan Fyodorov, The Pioneer Bookprinter (Pervopechatnik Ivan Fyodorov, 1941) - Petr Timofeev, Ivan's assistant
Four Hearts (Serdtsa chetyryokh, 1945) - Red Army fighter Yeremeev
Ivan Nikulin (Alyokha, Russian sailor, 1945) - Alyokha
In the Mountains of Yugoslavia (V gorakh Yugoslavii, 1947) - Alexey Gubanov
Diamonds (Almazy, 1947) - geologist Sergey Nesterov
Stranitsy zhizni (1948) - Radio announcer (uncredited)
They've Got Their Motherland (U nikh est Rodina, 1950) - Sorokin
Zhukovsky (1950) - Student (uncredited)
In Steppe (V stepi, 1951, Short) - Partkom secretary Tuzhikov
Village Doctor (Selsky vratch, 1951) - Nikolay Korotkov
The Return of Vasily Bortnikov (Vozvraschenye Vasilia Bortnikova, 1953) - Kantaurov, the Telephone station director
Lawlessness (Bezzakoniye, 1954, Short) - Yermolai, dustman
The First Echelon (Pervy eshelon, 1956) - Sovkhoz director Dontsov
Different Fates (Raznye sudby, 1956) - Zhukov, the Party official
Polyushko-pole (1956) - telephone station director Kholin
Stories About Lenin (Rasskazy o Lenine, 1957) - Emelyyanov
The Swallow (Lastochka, 1957) - Melgunov
Pages of the Past (Stranitsy bylovo, 1957) - Skvortsov
Rasskazy o Lenine (1958) - N. A. Yemelyanov
Esimese järgu kapten (1958) - Matros (voice)
Upon the Path of War (Na dorogakh voyny, 1959) - Uvarov
In the Still of the Steppe (V stepnoi tishi, 1959) - Vetrov
The Unpaid Debt (Neoplatchenny dolg, 1959) - Aleksey Okunchikov
Still They Are People (Tozhe lyudi, 1959) - soldier
The Koltsov Song (Pesnya o Koltsove, 1959) - Koltsov's father
Three Times Resurrected (Trizhdy voskresshy, 1960) - Starodub
Five Days, Five Nights (Pyat dnei, pyat nochei, 1961) - Sergeant-major Kozlov
On the Road (V puti, 1961) - the old man
Grown-up Children (Vzroslye deti, 1961) - Vasily Vasilyevich
An Optimistic Tragedy (Optimisticheskaya tragediya, 1963) - Siply [the Husky-voiced]
It Happened at the Police Station (Eto sluchilos v militsii, 1963) - Major Sazonov
Small Green Light (Zelyony ogonyok, 1964) - the pensioner
Bolshaya ruda (1964)
The Meeting at the Crossover (Vstrech na pereprave, 1964) - The kolkhoz chairman
The Roll-call (Pereklichka, 1966) - Varentsov
Your Son and Brother (Vash syn i brat, 1966) - Voyevodin
Not a Day Without an Adventure (ni dnya bez priklyucheny, 1967) - old man Danilyuk
V zapadne (1967)
Moscow is Behind Our Backs (Moskva za nami, 1968) - General Ivan Panfilov
Just for Fun (Skuki radi, 1968) - Gomozov
Used Cartridge Cases (Strelyanye gilzy, 1968) - the Father
Liberation (Osvobozhdenye, 1968) - Colonel Lukin
The Major Witness (Glavny svidetel, 1969) - the Uncle
 I Am His Bride (Ya yevo nevesta, 1969) - Mitrokhin
The Kremlin Chime (Kremlyovskye kuranty, 1970) - the old worker
Strange People (Strannye lyudi, 1970) - Matvey Ryazantsev (segment "Dumy")
The Stolen Train (Ukradenny poezd, 1971) - General Ivan Vasylievich
The Return of Saint Luke (Vozvrashenye svyatovo Luki, 1971) - Colonel Zorin
Osvobozhdenie: Napravlenie glavnogo udara (1971) - Lukin
Ni dnya bez priklyucheniy (1971) - Danilyuk
Stoves and Benches (Pechki-lavochki, 1972) - Professor Sergey Fyodorovich
Eolomea (East Germany, 1972) - Kun
Nyurkina zhizn (1972) - Boris Gavrilovich
The Black Prince (Tchorny prints, 1973) - Colonel Zorin
Here's Our Home (Zdes nash dom, 1973) - Alexander Pluzhin
There, Over the Horizon (Tam, za gorizontom, 1975) - the General constructor
The Closeness of Distant Things (Blizkaya dal, 1976) - Pogodin
The Moscow Time (Vremya moskovskoye, 1976) - Nazar Lukich Grigorenko
And Other Officials (I drugiye ofitsyalnye litsa, 1976) - Astakhov
The Long Days' Month (Mesyats dlinnykh dney, 1978, TV Movie) - Pavel Stepanovich
The Colonel Zorin's Hypothesis (Versiya polkovnika Zorina, 1979) - Colonel Zorin
Blizkaya dal (1979)
Teheran 43 (1981) - Innkeeper (uncredited)
The Unwelcome Friend (Nezvany drug, 1981) - Shlepyanov
From Winter Till Winter (Ot zimy do zimy, 1981) - the Minister
Chastnaya zhizn (1982) - Bit part (uncredited)
The Mystery of the Blackbirds (Taina Tchyornykh Drozdov, 1982) - Mister George Forteskew
White Dew (Belye rosy, 1982) - Fedos Khodas
From Evening Till Noon (S vetchera do poludnya, 1982) - writer Andray Zharkov
Secret of the Black Birds (Тайна «Чёрных дроздов», 1983) - George Fortescue
Dead Souls (Myortvye dushi, 1984, TV Mini-Series) - the Court chairman
The Hope and the Stand-by (Nadezga i opora, 1985) - Kirill Rotov
In Bad Weather (V rasputitsu, 1986) - Strogov
The Apellation (Apellyatsia, 1987) - Mironov
Forgotten Melody for a Flute (Zabytaya melodiya dlya fleity, 1987) - Yaroslav Stepanovich
What a Mess! (1995) - the music fan (final film role)

References

External links 
 

1912 births
1996 deaths
People from Tula, Russia
Soviet male film actors
Soviet male stage actors
People's Artists of the USSR
Recipients of the Order of Lenin
Russian Academy of Theatre Arts alumni
Burials at Novodevichy Cemetery